Skownan First Nation is a Saulteaux (Ojibwe) First Nations band government whose reserve community, Waterhen 45, is located 288 km north of Winnipeg, Manitoba, Canada, on the south shore of Waterhen Lake, between Lake Winnipeg and Lake Winnipegosis. As of May, 2015, the First Nation had 1,464 registered members, of which 750 lived on-reserve.

The Skownan First Nation is a member of the West Region Tribal Council.

Skownan First Nation also owns and operates a local radio station, known as 98.7 SKO FM. The radio station services the community.

History
Originally, the First Nation was known as the Waterhen River Band of Saulteaux and later simply as Waterhen First Nation (not to be confused with the Waterhen Lake Band of Cree in Saskatchewan, known today as the Waterhen Lake First Nation). The Skownan First Nation is a signatory to Treaty 2. Their name comes from Ne-biimiskonaan, meaning 'to turn around the point' or 'turning point' in the Anishinaabe language.

Governance
The Skownan First Nation elect their council on a now four*-year term under the authority of the Act Electoral System.  The current Chief is Cameron Catcheway; the Councillors are Ken Catcheway, Sterling Catcheway, Jimmy Chartrand and Charlotte Nepinak. The Chief and Councillors' terms began on November 3, 2016 and will expire on November 5, 2020.

The First Nation is a member of West Region Tribal Council, a regional tribal council.

List of Chiefs

Reserves
The Skownan First Nation has only one Indian reserve, the 1,856.7-hectare Waterhen Indian Reserve No. 45.

References

External links
 AANDC profile
 Statistics Canada's 2006 Census for Waterhen 45
 Skownan First Nation History from West Manitoba Genealogy
 Seeing the path: the Skownan Vision Seekers Initiative
 Map of Waterhen 45 at Statcan

West Region Tribal Council
First Nations governments in Manitoba
Saulteaux